The Ambassador of Israel to Canada is Israel's foremost diplomatic representative in Canada. The Ambassador is based in the Embassy of Israel, Ottawa.

List of Ambassadors
Ronen Hoffman incumbent 
Nimrod Barkan 2016 - 
Rafael Barak 2013 - 2016
Miriam Ziv 2008 - 2013
Alan Baker (diplomat) 2004 - 2008
Haim Divon 2000 - 2004
David Sultan 1996 - 2000 
Itzhak Selef 1990 - 1995
Israel Gur Arie 1987 - 1990
Eliashiv Ben-Horin 1984 - 1987
Yeshayahu Anug 1979 - 1984
Mordechai Shalev 1975 - 1979
Ephraim Evron 1969 - 1971
Rome Sinai 1968 - 1969
Arie Eshel 1967 - 1968
Avner Gershon 1963 - 1967
Mesholam Veron 1963 
Ambassador Yaacov Herzog 1960 - 1963
Arthur Lourie (diplomat) 1957-1959
Ambassador Michael Comay 1954 - 1957 (Minister 1953 - 1954)

Consulate (Montreal)
Paul Hirschson 2021-
Consul General David Levy (diplomat) 2018 - 
Ziv Nevo Kulman 2014 - 2017
Gideon Saguy 1982 - 1986
David Rivlin 1962 - 1965
Joel Lion 2011 - 2014
Yoram Elron 2007 - 2011 
Marc Attali 2003 - 2007
Shlomo Avital 1999 - 2003
Daniel Gal 1994 - 1999
Itzhak Levanon 1990 - 1994 
Yakov Aviad 1983 - 1986
Zvi Caspi 1977 - 1980, 1966 - 1968
Davir Efrati 1971 - 1973
Michael Simon (diplomat) 1957 - 1960
Yehuda Gaulan 1954 - 1957
Moshe Yuval 1950 - 1952
Avraham Harman 1949 - 1950

Consulate (Toronto)
Idit Shamir 2021-
Consul General Galit Baram August 2016 - 
David Schneeweiss 2012 - 2016
Amir Reshef-Gissin 2007 - 2012
Yaakov Brosh 2003 - 2007
Meir Romem 1999 - 20032
Jehudi Kinar 1995 - 2000
Benjamin Abileah 1987 - 1991
David Ariel 1978 - 1982 
Shmuel Ovnat 1972 - 1977
Aba Gefen 1967 - 1971

References

Canada
Israel
Israel
Ottawa